The Padre is a 2018 Canadian drama film directed by Jonathan Sobol and starring Tim Roth, Nick Nolte and Luis Guzman.

Plot
It tells the redemption tale of the Padre, a rehabilitated convict who is on the run from his dogged pursuer and father-in-law, a United States Marshal Nemes and his hired local police officer Gaspar in Colombia. A precocious teenager, Lena, is a stowaway with Padre who hopes to reach Minnesota. She blackmails and befriends him for joining his journey. The duo plans both a heist and getting away from vengeful Nemes.

Cast
Tim Roth as The Padre
Nick Nolte as Nemes
Luis Guzman as Gaspar
Valeria Henríquez as Lena

Production
Principal photography began in March 2017 in Bogota, Colombia. In November 2017, it was confirmed that Nolte completed all of his scenes.

Reception
Glenn Kenny of RogerEbert.com awarded the film two stars.

References

External links
 
 
 
 
 The Padre at Library and Archives Canada

2018 films
Canadian drama films
English-language Canadian films
Films shot in Colombia
Films directed by Jonathan Sobol
2010s English-language films
2010s Canadian films